Murwillumbah, an electoral district of the Legislative Assembly in the Australian state of New South Wales was created in 1988 and abolished in 1999.


Election results

Elections in the 1990s

1995

1991

Elections in the 1980s

1988

References

New South Wales state electoral results by district